The Temple of Amada, the oldest Egyptian temple in Nubia, was first constructed by Pharaoh Thutmose III of the 18th dynasty and dedicated to Amun and Re-Horakhty. His son and successor, Amenhotep II continued the decoration program for this structure. Amenhotep II's successor, Thutmose IV decided to place a roof over its forecourt and transform it into a pillared or hypostyle hall. During the Amarna period, Akhenaten had the name Amun destroyed throughout the temple but this was later restored by Seti I of Egypt's 19th Dynasty. Various 19th Dynasty kings especially Seti I and Ramesses II also "carried out minor restorations and added to the temple's decoration." The stelas of the Viceroys of Kush Setau, Heqanakht and Messuy and that of Chancellor Bay describe their building activities under Ramesses II, Merneptah and Siptah respectively. In the medieval period the temple was converted into a church.

As part of the International Campaign to Save the Monuments of Nubia, along with Abu Simbel, Philae and other Nubian archaeological sites, Amada was relocated in the 1960s and inscribed on the UNESCO World Heritage List in 1979.

Temple interior

The original building plan for the structure featured a pylon, forecourt and a portico which led to a sanctuary. However, when Thutmose IV roofed the open forecourt, the pillars and walls "were decorated with offering scenes, with those involving Thutmosis IV on the left" and Thutmose III and Amenhotep II on the right. Although the temple has a dull and crumbling exterior, its interior features enjoy some of the most finely cut reliefs with bright and vibrant colours.

The finest painted reliefs are in the innermost section of the temple where Thutmose III and Amenhotep II are shown being embraced or making offerings to various Egyptian gods. The left hand side of the vestibule shows Amenhotep II being crowned by Horus and Thoth and running with an oar and a hap (or navigational instrument). The cult room at the side of the sanctuary contains some interesting foundation and consecration scenes for the temple which depict "the ritual of the 'stretching of the cord', the ceremonial making and laying of bricks, and the offering of the temple to its gods."

Historical records
There are two important historical inscriptions from Amada temple. The earliest, dated to Year 3 of Amenhotep II, "is on a round topped stelae at the rear (eastern) wall of the sanctuary." Its text describes this pharaoh's ruthless military campaign in Asia: 

Amenhotep II goes on to describe how he hanged six of the dead chiefs "on the walls of Thebes" while the seventh was hung on the walls of Napata (a Nubian frontier city near the Fourth Cataract). This was done as a clear warning to the subject Nubians of the dangerous consequences of rebellion during Amenhotep's reign. The second historical text, "on a stela engraved on the left (northern) thickness of the entrance doorway" mentions the defeat of an invasion from Libya in Year 4 of Merneptah.

The temple was described by early travellers and first published by Henri Gauthier in 1913.

Church 
The temple was converted into a church presumabely in the 6th century. The Christians plastered the hieroglyphs with Christian paintings that survived until the 19th century. Frederic Louis Norden described them as early 1738 as depicting "the Trinity, the apostles, and divers (sic.) other saints". Franz Christian Gau painted what remained of them in 1822. Already a few years later, in 1830, Jean-Jacques Rifaud and Johann Matthias Neurohr proposed to tear the Christian paintings down to access the ancient Egyptian art beneath. They were destroyed soon after.

Relocation 

Between 1964 and 1975, the temple was moved from its original location to a new site "some 65 m higher and 2.5 km away from its original site". Chopping it into blocks, as was being done with the other temples, was not an option; the paintings would not have survived. Seeing that all seemed resigned to see the temple flooded by the silty waters of Lake Nasser, Christiane Desroches Noblecourt announced that France would save it. She asked two architects to propose a method for moving the temple in one piece. Their idea was to put the temple on rails and transport it hydraulically to a site a few kilometers away that was more than 60 meters higher.

The rock-cut Temple of Derr was also moved to the new site of Amada.

Gallery

See also
List of ancient Egyptian sites, including sites of temples

References

Egyptian temples
Thutmose III
Amenhotep II
Tourist attractions in Egypt
International Campaign to Save the Monuments of Nubia